Town Hall Visakhapatnam is a  municipal building in Visakhapatnam, India.

History
The foundation of town hall is laid on 1893 the construction cost of  50,000  borrowed from Raja of Bobbili and the town hall is handover to 
Vizagpatam Municipality at 1904. and the total area of town hall is 5,000 square feet. late 1960'scentre of theatrical, cultural and literary events so so GVMC is Renovated this town hall.

References

Buildings and structures in Visakhapatnam
City and town halls in India